Steven Bastien (born 13 March 1963) is a former English cricketer. Bastien was a right-handed batsman who bowled right-arm medium-fast and played as a swing bowler for Glamorgan County Cricket Club between 1988 and 1994. He was born at Stepney in London in 1963 and played cricket in Dominica before completing his education at Haringey College in London.

References

External links

1963 births
Living people
People from Stepney
English cricketers
Glamorgan cricketers